Carmelita may refer to:
 Asociación Deportiva Carmelita, a Costa Rican football team
 Carmelita (name), feminine given name in English and Spanish
 Carmelita Airport, a small airport in Guatemala
 Carmelita, Belize, settlement in the Orange Walk District of Belize
 Carmelita, Petén, settlement in the municipality of San Andrés,  Petén Department of Guatemala
 Carmelita Hinton (1890-1983), American progressive educator
 Carmelita Fox, fictional character in the Sly Cooper video games
 Carmelita Spats, character from the children's series A Series of Unfortunate Events
 Carmelita (baseball), a Cuban baseball team
 Carmelita (song), song by Warren Zevon from his 1976 solo album
 "Carmelita", song by Rick Recht from his 1999 album Tov